Alopoglossus theodorusi is a species of lizard in the family Alopoglossidae. It is found in the eastern Guiana Shield, in French Guiana and northern Brazil (Amapá state). The specific name honors the herpetologist Theodorus Willem van Lidth de Jeude.

Alopoglossus theodorusi measures  in snout–vent length (SVL). The tail in the holotype, an adult female, is 1.65 times SVL.

References

Alopoglossus
Reptiles of French Guiana
Reptiles of Brazil
Reptiles described in 2020
Taxa named by Antoine Fouquet